Dusk Till Dawn may refer to:

 "Dusk Till Dawn" (Zayn song), 2017
 "Dusk Till Dawn" (Ladyhawke song), 2008
 Dusk Till Dawn (album), by Bobby V
 Dusk Till Dawn (casino), a cardroom and casino in Lenton, Nottingham

See also
 From Dusk till Dawn (disambiguation)
 Dusk to Dawn, a 1922 silent film by King Vidor
 Dusk till Dawn: The Best of Capercaillie, a compilation album
 Dawn to Dusk (disambiguation)